Spider-Man: Return of the Sinister Six is a video game featuring the Marvel Comics characters Spider-Man and the Sinister Six. It was developed by Bits Studios and published by LJN for the Nintendo Entertainment System in 1992. Versions of the game were also released for the Master System and Game Gear by the Flying Edge division of Acclaim. The game is loosely based on the story arc of the same name, which was published in The Amazing Spider-Man #334-339 in the early 1990s.

Plot
Doctor Octopus is setting his master plan into action to take over the world with the help of the Sinister Six. Spider-Man manages to defeat all of them and save the world.

Gameplay
The player controls Spider-Man through six side-scrolling levels, with a member of the Sinister Six (Electro, Sandman, Mysterio, Vulture, Hobgoblin, and Doctor Octopus) at the end of each level as a boss. Spider-Man can jump, punch, kick, duck, climb certain walls and trees, shoot webs to swing on and collect web fluid to shoot square web projectiles.

The levels are generally straightforward side-scrolling action, although occasionally a particular item such as key or a detonator has to be found.

Spider-Man has only one life in the NES version, but also has one continue. There are no icons available to restore energy. However, defeating several enemies can restore Spider-Man's power bar.

Ports
In comparison to the NES version, the Sega Master System version is easier as certain items were moved (typically to easier places to find), some enemies are taken out, some jumps are redesigned to be easier, and Doctor Octopus and Mysterio now only have one health bar (versus the NES version where they would regenerate a few times before being defeated), among a few other changes.

The Game Gear version is identical to the Sega Master System version except that the screen shows a smaller portion of the level, which makes it harder to see incoming projectiles.

Reception
Nintendo Power commented on the NES version of the game, praising the graphics while stating the play control was weak, commenting that "you can release what looks like a perfect punch and end up swinging right past your enemy".

References

1992 video games
Acclaim Entertainment games
Game Gear games
LJN games
Nintendo Entertainment System games
Master System games
Video games based on Spider-Man
Video games set in New York City
Superhero video games
Video games scored by David Whittaker
Video games developed in the United Kingdom
Bits Studios games
Single-player video games